Richard Katz (November 21, 1888 – November 8, 1968) was a German journalist, travel writer, and essayist from Bohemia. While writing both grandiose and humble prose, his style is consistently imbued with a sense of humor, humility and love for all things living.

Early years
After graduation Katz studied law at The German University in Prague. During his studies, he wrote for a variety of newspapers and magazines. Upon graduation, he began work with the now defunct Vossische Zeitung newspaper in their Prague office. During this placement, he spent a year in East Asia working as a traveling reporter.

Career in journalism
After the First World War, Katz moved to Leipzig and in 1924 he became director of the Leipzig Publishing Company, a position he held for two years. In the years between 1928 and 1930, he was a clerk for the Ullstein publishing house in Berlin. While working in this position, Katz founded the Green Post, a periodical which very quickly reached a circulation of over one million. The financial success allowed Katz to establish himself as an independent writer, giving him the freedom to travel the world while writing of his experiences.

Travel and publication
During the period between 1925 and his death, Katz published nearly thirty-five volumes, mostly personally written journalistic travel books. His other areas of interests were animals – specifically dogs – and gardening. Some of his most refreshing works center around the personalities of dogs, and the methods one must employ to be a successful gardener.

In 1933, Katz emigrated to Switzerland. In 1941, he moved to Brazil obtaining citizenship there. In 1956 he returned to Switzerland where he died in 1968 living above Locarno.

Selected works

Works translated into English
  (Loafing Around the Globe)
  (Rays From the East)
  (Solitary Life)

Untranslated German travel books
  (Pleasant Days with Brown Peoples)
  (Zig-Zagging Through South America)
  (Harvest)
  (The voyage round the world in the Johannisnacht)
  (My Island Book – first experiences in Brazil)
  (Strange travels in Brazil)
  (Travel Fever)
  (Meetings in Rio)
  (On the Amazon)
  (Per Hill's hardest case – a serious detective story)
  (A Great Deal from a Far Off Country)
  (Wandering World)
  (Greetings from the Hammock)

Stories regarding domestic matters
  (Nature's Jewels)
  (Four Stories on Animals)
  (From Dog to Dog)
  (On Gardening)
  (Hobbies)

Political work
  (The Three Faces of Lucifer: Noise, Machines, Business)

Autobiographical works
  (Lost in the City)
  (Solitary Life)

Literature
 Jeroen Dewulf: Brasilien mit Brüchen. Schweizer unter dem Kreuz des Südens, Zürich: NZZ Verlag 2007.

References

Writers from Prague
1888 births
1968 deaths
Brazilian journalists
Male journalists
Brazilian male writers
Charles University alumni
German essayists
German travel writers
German emigrants to Switzerland
German emigrants to Brazil
German publishers (people)
German magazine founders
Naturalized citizens of Brazil
20th-century essayists
20th-century German journalists